The 2017 4 Nations Cup was a women's ice hockey tournament held in Tampa and Wesley Chapel, Florida, United States. It was the 22nd edition of the 4 Nations Cup.

Results

Preliminary round

All times are local (UTC−5).

Bronze medal game

Gold medal game

Statistics

Final standings

Scoring leaders
Only the top ten skaters, sorted by points, then goals, are included in this list.

GP = Games played; G = Goals; A = Assists; Pts = Points; PIM = Penalties in minutes; POS = Position
Source: USA Hockey

Goaltending leaders
Only the top four goaltenders, based on save percentage, who played at least 40% of their team's minutes, are included in this list.

TOI = Time on Ice (minutes:seconds); SA = Shots against; GA = Goals against; GAA = Goals against average; Sv% = Save percentage; SO = Shutouts
Source: USA Hockey

External links
Official website

2017
2017–18 in American women's ice hockey
2017–18 in Canadian women's ice hockey
2017–18 in Finnish ice hockey
2017–18 in Swedish ice hockey
2017–18 in women's ice hockey
Ice hockey in Tampa, Florida
2017
Sports competitions in Tampa, Florida
Ice hockey competitions in Florida